Oscar Castro may refer to:

 Óscar Castro Zúñiga (1910–1947), Chilean poet
 Oscar Castro (chess player) (1953–2015), Colombian chess master
 Óscar Castro Ramírez (1947–2021), Chilean playwright, actor and director
 Oscar Castro-Neves (1940–2013), Brazilian guitarist
 Oscar Padula Castro (born 1993), Uruguayan footballer